Marine Fighting Squadron 413 (VMF-413) was a fighter squadron of the Marine Forces Reserve during the Cold War.  It descended from bombing squadron VMB-413, which was the Marine Corps' first medium bomber squadron and had fought during World War II.   Best known as “Night Hecklers” and the “Shamrocks”, the squadron fought in many areas of the Pacific War.

Following the surrender of Japan, the squadron was deactivated on November 30, 1945. VMF-413 reactivated in the Marine Forces Reserve and was based out of Naval Air Station Dallas, Texas, until its deactivation in January 1963.

History

The squadron was activated on March 1, 1943, as Marine Bombing Squadron 413 (VMB-413) at Marine Corps Air Station Cherry Point, North Carolina.  On December 1, 1943, the squadron completed their training at MCAS Cherry Point and from there moved to the West Coast until finally leaving from Naval Air Station North Island on January 3, 1944. They arrived at Espiritu Santo on January 27, 1944, and remained there until March 7, 1944, when they were sent to Stirling Island in the Treasury Islands.  While stationed there the squadron flew a few night-time heckling missions against the Japanese garrisons at Kahili, Bougainville and Rabaul until July 1944 when they moved back to Espiritu Santo. During that time the squadron lost five aircraft along with 32 crewmen.

In July 1944, VMB-413 began operating from Munda from where they began to raid both Kahili and Choiseul on a regular basis until October 18, 1944 when they moved to Emirau.  From there they ran missions against Japanese forces in New Ireland and New Britain until the surrender of Japan in August 1945.

Following the end of the war, the squadron was reactivated in the reserves at Naval Air Station Dallas.  During this time, they shared aircraft with VMF-111 and VMF-112 until they were deactivated in January 1963.

Unit awards

A unit citation or commendation is an award bestowed upon an organization for the action cited. Members of the unit who participated in said actions are allowed to wear on their uniforms the awarded unit citation. VMB-413 was presented with the following awards:

See also

 United States Marine Corps Aviation
 List of active United States Marine Corps aircraft squadrons
 List of decommissioned United States Marine Corps aircraft squadrons

Notes

References
Bibliography

Fighting413
Inactive units of the United States Marine Corps